The genus Tisamenus native to the Philippines combines small to medium-sized species of stick insects.

Taxonomy 
In 1875 Carl Stål established the genus Tisamenus in addition to the genus Hoploclonia. In this he described the type species determined by William Forsell Kirby in 1904 Tisamenus serratorius. He also transferred two species described by John Obadiah Westwood in 1848 to this genus, namely Phasma (Pachymorpha) deplanatum (today's name Tisamenus deplanatus) and Phasma (Pachymorpha) draconinum (current name Tisamenus draconina). James Abram Garfield Rehn and his son John William Holman Rehn mention in 1939 the special position of the two Hoploclonia species Hoploclonia gecko and Hoploclonia cuspidata, which are already known from Borneo, but synonymized Tisamenus with Hoploclonia. They transferred all previously known Tisamenus species to the genus Hoploclonia, in which they described a further eight species. They created an identification key for the Philippine species and divided them into four subgroups according to morphological aspects. They also described the genus Ilocano for Ilocano hebardi and transferred the species listed as Heterocopus ranarius (current name Tisamenus ranarius) to this genus. In 2004 the two genera were separated again and the Filipino species were transferred back to the genus Tisamenus. Only those occurring on Borneo were left in the genus Hoploclonia. In 2021, a study based on genetic analysis shows that Ilocano hebardi, the only remaining species of this genus at that time, belongs to Tisamenus, whereby Ilocano became a synonym for it. The division into subgroups made in 1939 could not be confirmed for four investigated species known by name. The name "Tisamenus" is the Latinisation of the Greek Tisamenos (Τισαμενός), a ancient, male given name.

Valid species are:
 Tisamenus alviolanus Lit & Eusebio, 2010
 Tisamenus armadillo Redtenbacher, 1906
 Tisamenus asper Bolívar, 1890
 Tisamenus atropos (Rehn, J.A.G. & Rehn, J.W.H., 1939)
 Tisamenus cervicornis Bolívar, 1890
 Tisamenus clotho (Rehn, J.A.G. & Rehn, J.W.H., 1939)
 Tisamenus deplanatus (Westwood, 1848)
 Tisamenus draconina (Westwood, 1848)
 Tisamenus fratercula (Rehn, J.A.G. & Rehn, J.W.H., 1939)
 Tisamenus hystrix (Rehn, J.A.G. & Rehn, J.W.H., 1939)
 Tisamenus hebardi (Rehn, J.A.G. & Rehn, J.W.H., 1939)(Syn. = Ilocano hebardi Rehn, J.A.G. & Rehn, J.W.H., 1939)
 Tisamenus kalahani Lit & Eusebio, 2005
 Tisamenus lachesis (Rehn, J.A.G. & Rehn, J.W.H., 1939)
 Tisamenus polillo (Rehn, J.A.G. & Rehn, J.W.H., 1939)
 Tisamenus ranarius (Westwood, 1859)
 Tisamenus serratorius Stål, 1875
 Tisamenus spadix (Rehn, J.A.G. & Rehn, J.W.H., 1939)
 Tisamenus summaleonilae Lit & Eusebio, 2005
 Tisamenus tagalog (Rehn, J.A.G. & Rehn, J.W.H., 1939)

Description 
Both sexes are wingless. The often very similar species differ mainly in their species-specific spines. There are also species that have no or barely recognizable spines. A triangular structure on the mesonotum is characteristic of all representatives. The short side of this isosceles triangle runs parallel to the leading margin of the mesonotum. The other two sides are longer and meet more or less after a third of the mesonotum length, depending on the species. From there a mostly clear keel runs in the middle. In some species this begins at the front margin of the mesonotum and can therefore also be recognized on the triangle. Sometimes it extends to the abdomen or even to the end. Spines are often found on the lateral margins of the thorax, in pairs on the pronotum, and in the middle of the meso- and metanotum. Many representatives also have additional paired and/or centrally arranged spines on the abdomen. The color is mostly dominated by light brown tones. Often, black, light brown to beige patterns can be found, less often even almost white patterns. Males are usually less patterned. When looking at them from above, they often notice their abdomen, which is apparently much too narrow. This is especially true for species whose thorax becomes wider and wider towards the metanotum. The proportions of the females appear more symmetrical, as the abdomen is always wider than that of the males. As is typical for the representatives of the Obriminae, they have a secondary ovipositor at the end of the abdomen for laying the eggs in the ground, which is rather short in Tisamenus females. It surrounds the actual ovipositor and is ventral formed from the eighth sternite, here called subgenital plate or operculum and dorsally from the eleventh tergum, which is referred to here as the supraanal plate or epiproct.

Way of life and reproduction 
The nocturnal animals hide near the ground during the day. The eggs are laid in the ground by the females with the ovipositor. The micropylar plate has three arms and resembles an upside-down "Y". The arm pointing to the lid (operculum) is significantly longer than the arms pointing to the lower pole. The nymphs hatch after 4 to 6 months and need 5 to 7 months to become adult.

In terraristics 
In the terrariums of the enthusiasts, in addition to some species that have already been identified, there are many previously scientifically unprocessed breeding stocks. The first animals of the genus which were bred in Europe were collected in 2009 by Joachim Bresseel and Thierry Heitzmann in the Quezon on Luzon. Locations are the Sierra Madre mountains near Real and Real itself. Bresseel, Rob Krijns and Tim Bollens found more animals in 2010. The animals first came to Europe as Tisamenus sp. 'Sierra Madre' or Tisamenus sp. 'Real'. The species was later identified by Bresseel as Tisamenus serratorius. The Phasmid Study Group lists them under PSG number 314.

At the end of November 2008, Heitzmann collected a female in the Quezon National Park from which another breeding stock can be traced back. Specimens of this stock are called Tisamenus sp. 'Quezon National Park', according to initial assessments, it also belongs to Tisamenus serratorius Bressell, Bollens and Mark Bushell also found other specimens on Luzon in the province Aurora near the city San Luis in Cunayan. These are also similar to Tisamenus serratorius, but have more or clearer spines, especially along the middle of the body. They are also named after where they were found and called Tisamenus sp. 'Cunayan'. The Phasmid Study Group gave them the PSG number 359.

In October and November 2010, Heitzmann found Tisamenus deplanatus in southern Luzon in the Pocdol Mountains on Mount Pulog and on Mount Osiao, including the previously unknown males. The resulting breeding stock is called Tisamenus deplanatus 'Pocdol' and received PSG number 399 from the Phasmid Study Group. In 2014, Heitzmann again collected other, very similar animals in the Ilocos region. According to their origin they are called Tisamenus sp. 'Ilocos' and listed under PSG number 391. Frank Hennemann identified these as Tisamenus fratercula of which no females were known until then.

Further stocks are Tisamenus sp. 'Sibuyan' collected by Heitzmann and Albert Kang and Tisamenus sp. 'Cagayan'. Another one, called Tisamenus sp. 'Palaui', comes from the island Palaui belonging to the Cagayan province. It resembles Tisamenus sp. 'Cagayan', but is bigger and clearly more contrasting and more intensely colored. From Camarines Norte comes a stock which, according to Bank et al, belongs to Tisamenus clotho. It was initially called Tisamenus cf. clotho 'Camarines'. No longer in breeding are Tisamenus herbardi introduced as Ilocano hebardi 'Sagada' and a small species called Tisamenus sp. 'Ifugao', which was collected by Heitzmann and Kang in April 2015.

The keeping and breeding of most of the species mentioned is considered easy. They willingly feed on various forage plants such as bramble, hazel, firethorn, ivy and Hypericum. They only need small, moderately moist terrariums with a substrate for laying eggs.

Gallery

References

External links

Phasmatodea
Insects of the Philippines
Phasmatodea genera
Taxa described in 1875